Sin Su-jin (born June 11, 1981), also known as Yozoh,, is a South Korean singer and actress. Yozoh released her first album My Name Is Yozoh in 2007. For contributing much to bringing Hongik University district's indie music to the mainstream, she is also known as the "singing goddess of Hongdae district". In 2010, she ventured into acting, appearing in Sogyumo Acacia Band's Story, Cafe Noir and Come, Closer.

Discography

Studio albums

Extended plays

Filmography

References

External links 
 
 
 
 

1981 births
Living people
South Korean film actresses
Geochang Shin clan
21st-century South Korean singers
21st-century South Korean women singers